The Digital and Intelligence Service (DIS) is the digital service branch of the Singapore Armed Forces (SAF) responsible in providing military intelligence to the armed forces, building up the country's digital defence, and protecting the psychological defence of its military personnel. It was established on 28 October 2022, in response to the increased number of attacks by non-state actors, and resulting damage from the Russian–Ukrainian cyberwarfare.

History
DIS was first announced on 2 March 2022 by Minister for Defence Ng Eng Hen during the Budget 2022 debate. In his speech, Ng highlighted the increase in attacks by non-state actors and resulting damage from the Russian–Ukrainian cyberwarfare to justify the necessity of a dedicated service branch to deal with hybrid warfare. The DIS was compared with its closest existing equivalent abroad, Germany's Cyber and Information Domain Service by The Straits Times.

The DIS will comprise several groups within the Singapore Armed Forces (SAF) previously established to deal with such threats, which are the C4I Community created in April 2012, Defence Cyber Organisation in March 2017, SAF C4 Command in November 2017, and the Cybersecurity Task Force in December 2020. The DIS will consolidate these organisations under one service branch dedicated to psychological defence, tackling digital domain threats, cybersecurity and military intelligence. It was projected to be formally established at the end of 2022.

On 2 August 2022, Parliament amended the Singapore Armed Forces Act and Constitution, formally placing the DIS under the SAF and granting the Chief of Digital and Intelligence Service (CDI) legal powers. The DIS was formally inaugurated on 28 October 2022 at the SAFTI Military Institute. The state colours was presented by President Halimah Yacob and the first Chief of Digital and Intelligence Service, Brigadier-General Lee Yi-Jin, was sworn into command.

Structure

The DIS is made up of the Digital Ops-Tech Centre and 4 commands: the Joint Intelligence Command, SAF C4 Command/Cybersecurity Task Force, Digital Defence Command and DIS Training Command. The DIS Training Command will be inaugurated in 2023.

Joint Intelligence Command 
The Joint Intelligence Command delivers intelligence support for the SAF. It is the amalgamation of the Imagery Support Group (ISG) and Counter-Terrorism Intelligence Group (CTIG).

SAF C4 Command/Cybersecurity Task Force 
The SAF C4 Command/Cybersecurity Task Force secures and handles the SAF's Command, Control, Communications and Computers (C4) capabilities. It is the amalgamation of the C4 Operations Group (C4OG) and Cyber Defence Group (CDG).

Digital Defence Command 
The Digital Defence Command consists of the Electronic Protection Group (EPG) and Psychological Defence Group (PDG), which assists the SAF in electronic protection and psychological defence respectively.

DIS Training Command 
The DIS Training Command facilitates the training of DIS personnel. The command will be established in 2023.

Digital Ops-Tech Centre 
The Digital Ops-Tech Centre is the heart of the SAF's digital expertise. It partners with various governmental agencies, academic institutes and industry specialist to develop on the DIS' digital domain.

Background

Personnel
The SAF plans to encourage male members of Cyber Youth Singapore to join the DIS, and is working with Nanyang Technological University to create an education scheme to train digital specialists. The service length of DIS personnel will be four years, which is twice the length of national service in Singapore. In addition, DIS will also recruit personnel specialising in data science, psychology, linguistics, anthropology and geography. Full-time national servicemen will also be enlisted into the DIS.

Uniforms
The No. 1 ceremonial uniform of the DIS comprises a white top, grey pants and a grey beret.

List of chiefs of Digital and Intelligence Service

See also
 Cyber and Information Domain Service, German counterpart

References

2022 establishments in Singapore
Military units and formations established in 2022